Eupholus tupinierii is a species of beetle belonging to the  family Curculionidae.

Description
It is close to Eupholus schoenherri. This species is usually bright blue-green, with three large transversal black bands across the elytra. The blue-green colour derives from very small scales.

Distribution
This species can be found in lowland rainforests of Papua New Guinea.

References 

 D. Dupont  -  Monographie des Trachyderides de la Famille des Longicornes, Forgotten Books, pg. 65 
 Encyclopaedia of Life
 Ubio.org
 Catalogue of Life

Entiminae
Insects of Papua New Guinea
Endemic fauna of Papua New Guinea
Taxa named by Félix Édouard Guérin-Méneville
Beetles described in 1838